Into the Unknown is a non-fiction series produced by Cineflix and hosted by Cliff Simon that first premiered on the History channel in the UK on February 24, 2020 under the alternative title Uncharted Mysteries. The show sees Simon travel solo across the globe, into some of the most extreme and forbidding landscapes, searching for hidden clues to some of the most nightmarish myths of all time.

Episodes

Season 1

References

 The truth behind nightmarish myths and legends | Radio Times
 Survivalist Cliff Simon ventures into the unknown in search of the truth | TV Player
 History Channel promo | YouTube 
 Survivalist Cliff Simon faces his deepest fears| TV24
 Survivalist Cliff Simon travels the world in search of answers to mysteries | Sky

External links
 
 

History (European TV channel) original programming
2020 American television series debuts
Television series by Cineflix